Mauritania is divided into several electoral districts (دوائر إنتخابية) for the election of deputies to the National Assembly, based on the departments of the country. The city of Nouakchott is treated as a single department for election purposes.

Electoral system
The 157 members of the National Assembly are elected by two methods; 113 are elected from single- or multi-member constituencies using either the two-round system or proportional representation; in single-member constituencies candidates require a majority of the vote to be elected in the first round and a plurality in the second round. In two-seat constituencies, voters vote for a party list (which must contain one man and one woman); if no list receives more than 50% of the vote in the first round, a second round is held, with the winning party taking both seats. In constituencies with three or more seats, closed list proportional representation is used, with seats allocated using the largest remainder method. For three-seat constituencies, party lists must include a female candidate in first or second on the list; for larger constituencies a zipper system is used, with alternate male and female candidates.

The remaining 40 seats are elected from two nationwide constituency, also using closed list proportional representation: a national list and a women's national list. A further four members representing Mauritanians in the diaspora are elected by an electoral congress formed by the rest of MPs.

Distribution of seats
Every department gets a set number of seats based on their population.

Electoral districts (2018-)

Diaspora seats

References